The Alternate (known in the U.S. as Agent of Death) is a 2000 American action film directed by Sam Firstenberg and starring Eric Roberts, Bryan Genesse, Ice-T, and Michael Madsen.

Cast
 Eric Roberts as The Alternate
 Bryan Genesse as The Leader
 Ice-T as Agent Williams
 Michael Madsen as Agent Jack Briggs
 John Beck as President John Fallbrook
 Brooke Theiss as Mary
 Larry Manetti as Agent Harris
 Eliza Roberts as Chief of Staff Donaldson
 J. Cynthia Brooks as Mrs. Fallbrook
 Richard Steinmetz as SWAT Leader
 Ronn Moss as Fake President

References

External links
 
 

2000 films
2000 direct-to-video films
2000 action films
2000 independent films
American action films
American independent films
Direct-to-video action films
Films about fictional presidents of the United States
Films about kidnapping
American films about revenge
Films about terrorism in the United States
Films directed by Sam Firstenberg
2000s English-language films
2000s American films